Non sibi sed patriae (or patriæ) is a Latin phrase meaning "not for self, but for country".

United Kingdom

The phrase is inscribed on some war memorials, such as the First World War memorial in Newcastle upon Tyne called The Response. This was created by the Welsh artist Sir William Goscombe John in 1923 and unveiled by the Prince of Wales (later Edward VIII); it is on the grounds of the Civic Centre at Barras Bridge.

The phrase appears on a £5 commemorative coin minted in honour of the Duke of Edinburgh's 70 years of public service, issued in August 2017.

United States
The phrase is used by the US Navy: it is inscribed over the chapel doors at the United States Naval Academy, and is the command logo of MCM Crew Reaper.

The phrase is used on the US Naval Sea Cadet Nashville LPD-13 unit crest.

The phrase is used by the 1-108th Field Artillery Regiment 28th Infantry Division 56th Stryker Brigade Combat Team of the Pennsylvania National Guard.

The phrase is carved on the Chester Confederate Monument (1905) in Chester, South Carolina.

India
The phrase has also been the motto and used on the institutional logo of King Edward Memorial Hospital and Seth Gordhandas Sunderdas Medical College, parel, Mumbai, Maharashtra, India.

References

External link

Latin words and phrases